Meir Wieseltier  (Hebrew: מאיר ויזלטיר, born 1941) is a prize-winning Israeli poet and translator.

Biography
Meir Wieseltier was born in Moscow in 1941, shortly before the German invasion of Russia. He was taken to Novosibirsk in southwestern Siberia by his mother and two older sisters. His father was killed while serving in the Red Army in Leningrad. After two years in Poland, Germany and France, the family immigrated to Israel. Wieseltier grew up in Netanya. 

In 1955, he moved to Tel Aviv, where he has lived ever since. He published his first poems at the age of eighteen. He studied at the Hebrew University of Jerusalem. In the early 1960s, he joined a group known as the Tel Aviv Poets. He was co-founder and co-editor of the literary magazine Siman Kriya, and a poetry editor for the Am Oved publishing house.

Literary career
Wieseltier has published 13 volumes of verse. He has translated English, French and Russian poetry into Hebrew. His translations include four of Shakespeare's tragedies, as well as novels by Virginia Woolf, Charles Dickens, E.M. Forster and Malcolm Lowry. Wieseltier often writes in the first person, assuming the role of a moralist searching for values in the midst of chaos. He has written powerful poems of social and political protest in Israel. His voice is alternately anarchic and involved, angry and caring, trenchant and lyric.

Wieseltier is a poet in residence at the University of Haifa.

Awards
Among the many awards received by Wieseltier are the following:
 In 1994, Wieseltier was the co-recipient (jointly with Hanoch Levin) of the Bialik Prize for literature.
In 2000, he received the Israel Prize, for literature and poetry.

Published works
 Shirim Iti'im (Slow Poems), 2000
 Merudim Vesonatot (Merudim and Sonnets), 2009
 Perek Alef, Perek Beit (Chapter 1, Chapter 2), 1967
 Meah Shirim (100 Poems), 1969
 Kakh (Take It),  1973
 Davar Optimi, Asiyat Shirim (Something Optimistic, The Making of a Poem), 1976
 Pnim Vahutz (Interior and Exterior), 1977
 Motzah El Ha-Yam (Exit into the Sea), 1981
 Kitzur Shnot Hashishim (The Concise Sixties) 1984
 Ee Yevani (Greek Island) 1985
 Michtavim Veshirim Aherim (Letters and other poems) 1986
 Makhsan (Storehouse), 1994 [Mahsan]
 The Flower of Anarchy, 2003, 
 Forty, 2010, (Arbaim)
 Davar Optimi, Asiyat Shirim (Something Optimistic, The Making of a Poem, a new edition + Appendix), 2012

See also
List of Bialik Prize recipients
List of Israel Prize recipients

References

Further reading
The Modern Hebrew Poem Itself, 2003,

External links
 Biography on the Institute for the Translation of Hebrew Literature
 God and Man in the Poetry of Meir Wieseltier, Speech on the occasion of Wieseltier's visit to Hebrew Union College, Stanley Nash
 The Flag Parade A poem by Wieseltier published in English by The Guardian
Of Rebels, Wretches, Mongols and Kreplach, a tribute to Meir Wieseltier, Natan Zach, Haaretz

1941 births
Living people
Israeli people of Russian-Jewish descent
Soviet emigrants to Israel
Israeli Jews
20th-century Israeli poets
Israel Prize in literature recipients
Israel Prize in Hebrew poetry recipients
Academic staff of the University of Haifa
Israeli translators
English–Hebrew translators
20th-century translators
21st-century Israeli poets
Israeli male poets
20th-century male writers
21st-century male writers
Recipients of Prime Minister's Prize for Hebrew Literary Works
Writers from Moscow